Paul Bradley may refer to:

Paul Bradley (English actor) (born 1955), English television actor
Paul Bradley (Canadian actor) (1940–2003), Canadian actor
Paul Bradley (fighter) (born 1983), American mixed martial artist
 Paul Bradley (producer) (born 1957), British producer for films such as Jefferson in Paris
Paul J. Bradley (born 1945), American Roman Catholic bishop

See also
Bradley Paul (born 1972), American poet
 Paul Brady (disambiguation)